The Fairmount Hotel in San Antonio, Texas was built in 1906.  It was moved about six blocks through downtown San Antonio in 1985 and was expanded in 1986.  It was listed on the National Register of Historic Places in 1988.

It is one of few former small "drummer", someone who "drums up" business, hotels in San Antonio used by traveling salesmen, who would stay at the hotel due to its affordable rates.

References

External links

Official site

National Register of Historic Places in San Antonio
Hotel buildings completed in 1906
Hotels in San Antonio
Hotel buildings on the National Register of Historic Places in Texas
1906 establishments in Texas